The 2020 Under-19 Cricket World Cup qualification was an international 50-over cricket tournament played to qualify for 2020 Under-19 Cricket World Cup.

Qualified teams

Africa

Division 2
It was held in Potchefstroom, South Africa from 19 to 28 August 2018. The top three teams (Nigeria, Sierra Leone and Tanzania) were promoted to Division 1 where they competed with Kenya, Namibia and Uganda.

Group A

Group B

Semi-finals

3rd-place play-off

Final

Division 1
The Africa Division One tournament was played in Windhoek, Namibia from 17 to 23 March 2019. Nigeria won the tournament by winning all five of their matches to qualify through to their first World Cup.

(H) - Host

Americas
Held in Maple Leaf Cricket Club in King City near Toronto, Canada from July 8–14, 2019. Canada remained unbeaten in the round robin stage and hence qualified for the 2020 ICC U-19 World Cup.

(H) – Host

Asia

Division 2
It was held in Bangkok and Chiang Mai, Thailand from 9–17 December 2018. The finalists Oman and Kuwait were promoted to Division 1 where they competed with United Arab Emirates, Nepal, Malaysia and Singapore.

Group A

(H) - Host

Group B

Semi-finals

3rd-place play-off

Final

Division 1
The Asian Division One tournament was played in Kuala Lumpur, Malaysia from 12 to 18 April 2019 It would be the United Arab Emirates who qualified through to their second World Cup after they won all five of their matches to finish ahead of Nepal.

(H) - Host

East Asia Pacific
The East Asia Pacific qualifier was held in Sano, Japan between 2–8 June 2019. Papua New Guinea and Japan were undefeated going into the final game against each other, but the match was scratched and Japan qualified for its first ever Under-19 World Cup after Cricket PNG suspended ten members of the Papua New Guinea squad due to breaching the team's code of conduct, leaving Papua New Guinea unable to field a team for the match.

Europe

Division 2
The Europe Division 2 tournament was hosted by England from 31 July – 8 August 2018. The top three teams (Netherlands, France and Denmark) were promoted to Division 1 where they competed with Ireland, Jersey and Scotland.

Group A

Group B

7th-place play-off

5th-place play-off

3rd-place play-off

Final

Division 1
The Division 1 was held in the Netherlands from 26 July to 1 August 2019.

(H) - Host

References

World Cup qualification, 2020
Qualification
Qualification for cricket competitions